The 2014–15 UC Santa Barbara Gauchos men's basketball team represented the University of California, Santa Barbara during the 2014–15 NCAA Division I men's basketball season. The Gauchos, led by 17th year head coach Bob Williams, played their home games at the UC Santa Barbara Events Center, nicknamed The Thunderdome, as members of the Big West Conference. They finished the season 19–14, 11–5 in Big West play to finish in a tie for second place. They advanced to the semifinals of the Big West tournament where they lost to UC Irvine. They were invited to the College Basketball Invitational where they lost in the first round to Oral Roberts.

Roster

Schedule and results

|-
!colspan=9 style="background:#1D1160; color:#FBCB55;"| Exhibition

|-
!colspan=9 style="background:#1D1160; color:#FBCB55;"| Non-conference games

|-
!colspan=9 style="background:#1D1160; color:#FBCB55;"| Conference games

|-
!colspan=9 style="background:#1D1160; color:#FBCB55;"| Big West tournament

|-
!colspan=9 style="background:#1D1160; color:#FBCB55;"| College Basketball Invitational

References

UC Santa Barbara Gauchos men's basketball seasons
UC Santa Barbara
UC Santa Barbara Gauchos men's basketball team
UC Santa Barbara Gauchos men's basketball team
UC Santa Barbara